Potluri Vara Prasad (born 8 September 1970), popularly known as "PVP" is a serial entrepreneur, philanthropist and educationalist. He owns the film production company called PVP cinema. He also founded Telugucinema.com in 1997 which was the first website on the internet focusing on Telugu film industry.

Early life 
He was Born to Potluri Raghavendra Rao and P Manga Taradevi. He has two siblings.

Career

Procon, Inc. Michigan and Albion Orion Company LLC, 1996 to 2000 

Founded and built an IT services company into one of the fastest growing IT services players in the USA. Began the company with $100 and grew to a 225 employee base and revenues of $22 million in 27 months. Procon Inc. was acquired by RCM Technologies in 1998. AOC, LLC was acquired by SSI in 2000 for INR 2.92 billion, then the largest cross-border deal. Irevna Limited was acquired by CRISIL (S&P India) in 2005.

Founded Albion Orion Company, a roll up in IT solutions space in the US by acquiring and restructuring two high-end solution providers, Albion International in Atlanta and Orion Consulting in Minneapolis. Subsequently, led the merger of the consolidated entity to SSI Ltd., a publicly traded firm on LSE for $63.65m (2.92 billion), considered as the largest cross border transaction in India as of December 2000.

IREVNA Ltd. and PVP Ventures Ltd., 2001 to 2007 

Co-founded and built Irevna Ltd., an organisation providing analytics and research services to investment banks from offshore location. The organisation was the first to pioneer KPO services. Irevna Ltd. was acquired by CRISIL Ltd., an S&P company in May 2005. This company contributes 50% of entire profitability for Crisil in the current environment.

The company has investment interests in realty and is one of the largest investors in the country in media and entertainment. The company focusses on special situation transactions across multiple domains. The company was formed via acquisition of SSI Ltd. in Chennai on 27 February 2007 with an FDI investment of 8.93 billion.

Presently he is the chairman & managing director of PVP Ventures Ltd., PVP is a publicly traded corporation traded on BSE, NSE  & LSE with 35,000 shareholders. In July 2010, PVP Group ventured into the Indian Media & Entertainment Industry via "Picturehouse Media Ltd". ("PHML"), it is India's largest organised media capital house, supporting the Financing needs of the Indian Entertainment Industry. PHML recent foray into mainstream film production under the banner of PVP Cinema is one of the largest production houses in the country.

In July 2010, PVP group ventured into the Indian Media & Entertainment Industry via "Picturehouse Media Limited" (listed on BSE ) and its subsidiary "PVP Capital Ltd." (RBI registered NBFC).  Within 2.5 years, PHML has achieved phenomenal success in Tamil & Telugu film financing.

In line with the vision, PVP made a bid for Deccan Chargers Team (Hyderabad franchise of Indian Premier League) and emerged as the highest bidder. PVP has recently invested in the Hyderabad franchise "Hyderabad Hotshots" of Indian Badminton League and emerged as the Winning Champions in the Inaugural season of league – 2013.

2008 to present 
He is chief patron of Prasad Vara. Potluri Siddhartha Institute of Technology, in Vijaywada. He is also a patron in LV Prasad Eye Institute. He is the owner of the Hyderabad Hotshots, one of the six franchises of Indian Badminton League and  former co-owner of the Kerala Blasters F.C.

He is a Strategic Investor in Maven Corp and Karvy Consultants  & a Founding Investor of CBay Systems.

Philanthropy
Potluri Vara Prasad sponsored young chess prodigy Priyanka Nuttaki for her participation in the Asian Chess Championship held in Iran.

Political life 
In March 2019, PVP joined YSR Congress Party in presence of Y. S. Jaganmohan Reddy. He got the Lok Sabha seat from Vijayawada.

References

Telugu film producers
Indian film distributors
Businesspeople from Vijayawada
Living people
Kerala Blasters FC owners
Film producers from Andhra Pradesh
1970 births
YSR Congress Party politicians